Péter Tóth (born 25 June 1977 in Szombathely) is a Hungarian football player who currently plays for SC Dörfl.

Coaching career
After spells in Austria at SC Pinkafeld, UFC Jennersdorf and SC Lockenhaus, Tóth was appointed player-coach at fellow Austrian club SV Oberloisdorf in the summer 2017. In January 2019, Tóth returned to SC Lockenhaus, this time in a role as a player-coach.

In the summer 2020, Tóth joined SC Dörfl.

References 

HLSZ

1977 births
Living people
Sportspeople from Szombathely
Hungarian footballers
Hungarian expatriate footballers
Association football defenders
Szombathelyi Haladás footballers
Győri ETO FC players
Hungarian expatriate sportspeople in Austria
Expatriate footballers in Austria
Hungarian football managers